Walshville is a small village in Montgomery County, Illinois, United States. The population was 89 at the 2000 census.

Geography

Demographics

As of the census of 2000, there were 89 people, 28 households, and 23 families residing in the village. The racial makeup of the village was 100.00% White.

There were 28 households, out of which 53.6% had children under the age of 18 living with them, 67.9% were married couples living together, 10.7% had a female householder with no husband present, and 14.3% were non-families. 10.7% of all households were made up of individuals, and 7.1% had someone living alone who was 65 years of age or older. The average household size was 3.18 and the average family size was 3.38.

In the village, the population was spread out, with 34.8% under the age of 18, 6.7% from 18 to 24, 33.7% from 25 to 44, 15.7% from 45 to 64, and 9.0% who were 65 years of age or older. The median age was 31 years. For every 100 females, there were 102.3 males. For every 100 females age 18 and over, there were 114.8 males.

The median income for a household in the village was $19,219, and the median income for a family was $19,375. Males had a median income of $80,102 versus $20,625 for females. The per capita income for the village was $11,080. There were 24.1% of families and 40.0% of the population living below the poverty line, including 65.5% of under eighteens and none of those over 64.

References

External links
Walshville Illinois, Historical Society of Montgomery County Illinois

Villages in Montgomery County, Illinois
Villages in Illinois